Balacra furva is a moth of the family Erebidae. It was described by George Hampson in 1911. It is found in Ghana and Ivory Coast.

References

Balacra
Moths described in 1911
Erebid moths of Africa